Events from the year 1766 in Austria

Incumbents
 Monarch – Maria Theresa
 Monarch – Joseph II

Events

Births

 

  
 November 2 – Joseph Radetzky von Radetz, Austrian field marshal (d. 1858)

Deaths

 
 
 
 
 February 5 – Count Leopold Joseph von Daun, Austrian field marshal (b. 1705)

References

 
Years of the 18th century in Austria